Warmadewa University, abbreviated as Unwar, is a private university in Denpasar, Bali, Indonesia established on 17 July 1984. It has 6 faculties. The name was proposed by the Governor of Bali, Ida Bagus Mantra to honor a former king of Bali, Sri Kesari Warmadewa.

Partner Institution

Malaysia
Universiti Tunku Abdul Rahman

References

External links
 Official website

denpasar
Universities in Bali
Educational institutions established in 1984
1984 establishments in Indonesia
Private universities and colleges in Indonesia